Tontawan Tantivejakul (born 7 November 2000) also known as Tu Tontawan is a Thai actress and model. She first appeared in Ink Waruntorn Paonil's music video alongside Billkin Putthipong Assaratanakul. Her acting debut as a female lead was in F4 Thailand: Boys Over Flowers, Thai adaptation of Hana Yori Dango manga alongside Bright Vachirawit Chivaaree, which gained her international recognitions. She won '2022 Best Actress of the Year' awards twice.

Early life and education 
Tontawan was born in the city of Bangkok in Thailand on November 7, 2000. She is the younger sister of the Thai actor and musician, Tonhon Tantivejakul. Her mother is a communication arts professor at Chulalongkorn University, while her father works in advertising.

She attended Srinakharinwirot University Prasarnmit Demonstration School for elementary and received her entire secondary education from Chulalongkorn University Demonstration School. Currently, she is studying dentistry at Chulalongkorn University.

Career 
In 2020, at the age of 19, Tu appeared in Ink Waruntorn Paonil's music video for her song "Disappointed" (เหนื่อยใจ) with Billkin Putthipong Assaratanakul. Later that year, she signed a contract with GMMTV. In September 2020, official announcement was made through a teaser that she would debut in the Thai adaptation of Hana Yori Dango manga, F4 Thailand: Boys Over Flowers as the female lead, Gorya opposite Bright Vachirawit Chivaaree. She made her acting debut along with Jirawat Sutivanichsak and Hirunkit Changkham. The series was aired on December 18, 2021, which gained both popularity and best actress awards. In September 2022, she played Maki in 'Zero in the Moonlight', a short series 'Magic of Zero''' alongside Jirawat Sutivanichsak who played as her love interest.

On December 2021, during the GMMTV 2022: Borderless event, it was announced that Tu will play the lead role of Kongkwan in 10 Years Ticket'' alongside Ohm Pawat Chittsawangdee. The series began airing on December 14, 2022.

Filmography

Music video appearances

Television

Awards and nominations

References

External links 

 
 Tu Tontawan on Instagram

2000 births
Living people
Tontawan Tantivejakul
Tontawan Tantivejakul